Kate Polin (born June 10, 1967) is a French photographer.

Awards 
 2011 - First prize of FNAC contest, France.

Exhibitions 
 2011 - Printemps des poètes festival, exposition, Rouen, France.
 2010 - Estrapade, exposition, Paris, France.
 2009 - Gallery MAMA, exposition, Rouen, France.
 2008 - Buquet, exposition, Elbeuf, France.
 2008 - Zero, exposition, Rouen, France.

Gallery 
 2011 - Gallery Millennium Images, London, England.
 2008 - Art confrontations Gallery, Rouen, France.

Workshops 
 2011 - Workshop with Serge Picard, Arles, France.
 2008 - Workshop with Antoine D'Agata, Arles, France.

References

External links 

 

1967 births
Living people
French photographers
French women photographers